Showry (born Seo Ae-jin) [also known as "Syori" (쇼리)] is a South Korean shock comedian and vlogger. With over one million viewers on her Facebook page, Showry parodies the Muk-bang trend during her YouTube videos.

Showry also creates YouTube comedy videos under the title "The Showry Show". As of September 2018, Showry has over 13,500 subscribers and over 255,000 views.

References 

South Korean film actresses
Video bloggers
South Korean feminists
South Korean women comedians
South Korean YouTubers
Living people
Year of birth missing (living people)
Place of birth missing (living people)
South Korean bloggers
South Korean women bloggers
South Korean parodists